Jean Laroyenne (6 March 1930 – 13 February 2009) was a French fencer. He won a bronze medal in the team sabre event at the 1952 Summer Olympics.

References

External links
 

1930 births
2009 deaths
Sportspeople from Lyon
French male sabre fencers
Olympic fencers of France
Fencers at the 1952 Summer Olympics
Olympic bronze medalists for France
Olympic medalists in fencing
Medalists at the 1952 Summer Olympics